Rafael Nadal defeated Novak Djokovic in the final, 6–2, 3–6, 6–4, 6–1 to win the men's singles tennis title at the 2013 US Open. It was his second US Open title and 13th major title overall, moving him to third place on the all time men's singles major titles list, past Roy Emerson. This marked the third time in four years (following 2010 and 2011) that Nadal and Djokovic contested the final.

Andy Murray was the defending champion, but lost in the quarterfinals to Stan Wawrinka.

Djokovic and Nadal were in contention for the world No. 1 ranking. Djokovic retained the top position by reaching the final.

Roger Federer's streak of nine consecutive US Open quarterfinals ended when he lost to Tommy Robredo in the fourth round. Federer matched Wayne Ferreira's all-time record on his 56th consecutive major main draw appearance. This was also the last Grand Slam tournament for former world No. 4 James Blake and the last US Open appearance for former world No. 3 Nikolay Davydenko.

Seeds

 Novak Djokovic (final)
 Rafael Nadal (champion)
 Andy Murray (quarterfinals)
 David Ferrer (quarterfinals)
 Tomáš Berdych (fourth round)
 Juan Martín del Potro (second round)
 Roger Federer (fourth round)
 Richard Gasquet (semifinals)
  Stan Wawrinka (semifinals)
 Milos Raonic (fourth round)
 Kei Nishikori (first round)
 Tommy Haas (third round)
 John Isner (third round)
 Jerzy Janowicz (first round)
 Nicolás Almagro (first round)
 Fabio Fognini (first round)

 Kevin Anderson (second round)
 Janko Tipsarević (fourth round)
 Tommy Robredo (quarterfinals)
 Andreas Seppi (third round)
 Mikhail Youzhny (quarterfinals)
 Philipp Kohlschreiber (fourth round)
 Feliciano López (third round)
 Benoît Paire (first round)
 Grigor Dimitrov (first round)
 Sam Querrey (second round)
 Fernando Verdasco (first round)
 Juan Mónaco (first round, retired)
 Jürgen Melzer (first round)
 Ernests Gulbis (first round)
 Julien Benneteau (third round)
 Dmitry Tursunov (third round, retired)

Qualifying

Draw

Finals

Top half

Section 1

Section 2

Section 3

Section 4

Bottom half

Section 5

Section 6

Section 7

Section 8

References

External links
 Association of Tennis Professionals (ATP) – 2013 US Open Men's Singles draw
2013 US Open – Men's draws and results at the International Tennis Federation

Men's Singles
US Open - Men's Singles
US Open (tennis) by year – Men's singles